Fabio Christen (born 29 June 2002) is a Swiss racing cyclist, who currently rides for UCI ProTeam . His younger brother Jan Christen is also a professional cyclist.

Major results

2019
 1st  Time trial, National Junior Road Championships
2020
 National Junior Road Championships
1st  Time trial
2nd Road race
 7th Overall Grand Prix Rüebliland
2021
 3rd Road race, National Under-23 Road Championships
2022
 2nd  Mixed team relay, UEC European Under–23 Road Championships
 National Under-23 Road Championships
3rd Time trial
4th Road race
 4th Overall Istrian Spring Trophy
 5th Overall Tour du Pays de Montbéliard
 6th Grand Prix Velo Alanya

References

External links

2002 births
Living people
Swiss male cyclists